Ganzhou West railway station is a railway station located in Nankang District, Ganzhou, Jiangxi, China. It is one of two passenger railway stations in Ganzhou, the other being the more central Ganzhou railway station which is served by conventional trains. It has six platforms and an avoiding line in each direction.

The station is on the future Beijing–Hong Kong (Taipei) corridor.

History
The railway station was opened on 26 December 2019 with the Nanchang–Ganzhou high-speed railway.

References

Railway stations in Jiangxi
Railway stations in China opened in 2019